On 3 August 1979, a Constitutional Convention election was held in Markazi Province (encompassing today's Qom Province) with plurality-at-large voting format in order to decide two seats for the Assembly for the Final Review of the Constitution.

Only four candidates, who were all clerics, ran for the two seats. It resulted in a victory for the candidates supported by the Islamic Republican Party and its allies, in absence of their rival parties. Sadegh Khalkhali who also ran for a seat in Tehran Province at the same time (both without support of the Coalition of Islamic Parties), ended up in the third place.

Results 

 
 
|-
|colspan="14" style="background:#E9E9E9;"|
|-
 
 

|-
|colspan=14|
|-
|colspan=14|Source:

References

1979 elections in Iran
Markazi Province
Uncontested elections